"Pure Gold" is a song by the band Earth, Wind & Fire, released as a single in 2005 by Sanctuary Records. The song reached No. 23 on the Billboard Adult Contemporary chart and No. 15 on the Billboard Adult R&B Songs chart.

Overview
"Pure Gold" was written by Bobby Ross Avila, Issiah J. Avila, Tony L. Tolbert, Jimmy Jam and Terry Lewis. The song also came off Earth, Wind & Fire's 2005 album Illumination.

Critical reception
David Wild of Rolling Stone called the song "sexy".
Gene Stout of the Seattle Post Intelligencer described Pure Gold as a "soaring" tune. 
Bill Lamb of About proclaimed that "midway through Pure Gold, the (album)'s second track, the listener realizes once again what a gorgeous instrument Philip Bailey's voice is."

Use in other media
"Pure Gold" appeared on the soundtrack of the 2005 feature film Roll Bounce.

Charts

References

2004 songs
2005 singles
Earth, Wind & Fire songs
Songs written by Jimmy Jam and Terry Lewis